Gabriel Matías Fernández Leites (born 13 May 1994) is a Uruguayan professional footballer who plays as a forward for Liga MX club Juárez on loan from Spanish club RC Celta de Vigo.

Career
Fernández had youth stints with Club Atlético Pablan, Bella Vista and Defensor Sporting, featuring for the latter at the 2012 U-20 Copa Libertadores in Peru; where they finished as runners-up to Argentina's River Plate. On 8 January 2013, Fernández completed a loan move to fellow Primera División team Cerro Largo. He made his bow on 23 February against Montevideo Wanderers, which preceded his first goals arriving in March versus Progreso and Racing Club. Fernández returned to his parent club for 2013–14, making four appearances before leaving to join Racing Club. Braces followed in season one over Atenas and Sud América.

After spending three further seasons with Racing Club, participating in forty-nine matches and netting fifteen goals, Fernández switched teams in January 2018 by agreeing to sign for Peñarol. He scored his first goal on 24 February during a win over Liverpool, a club he later notched his first career hat-trick against in the following August on the way to Peñarol's fiftieth league title.

On 26 January 2019, Fernández secured a transfer to La Liga side Celta; effective from the following July, pending the outcome of his court case. The deal was confirmed on 4 July by Celta. His debut arrived in a home defeat to Real Madrid on 17 August. He got his opening goal for them on 24 August, scoring with a backheel flick to earn Celta a 1–0 win over Valencia in La Liga.

On 11 September 2020, Fernández was loaned to Segunda División side Real Zaragoza for the 2020–21 season.

Personal life
On 29 December 2018, Fernández was involved in a traffic collision in Montevideo which left Romina Fernández, 18, in a vegetative state, he had allegedly been speeding at 60km/h in a 45 speed limit zone. After testifying in court in May, the judge prohibited him from leaving the country without permission; with a work-dependent curfew also being set. Celta, who Fernández signed a pre-contract agreement with in the subsequent January, added a clause to the transfer that would see it cancelled if he was found guilty. In June 2019, his passport was returned and a settlement was reached with Romina's family which allowed Fernández to travel to officialise his transfer to Celta.

Career statistics

Honours
Peñarol
Primera División: 2018
Supercopa Uruguaya: 2018

References

External links

1994 births
Living people
Footballers from Montevideo
Uruguayan footballers
Association football forwards
Argentine expatriate footballers
Expatriate footballers in Spain
Argentine expatriate sportspeople in Spain
Uruguayan Primera División players
La Liga players
Segunda División players
Liga MX players
Defensor Sporting players
Cerro Largo F.C. players
Racing Club de Montevideo players
Peñarol players
RC Celta de Vigo players
Real Zaragoza players
FC Juárez footballers
Association football controversies
Expatriate footballers in Mexico
Argentine expatriate sportspeople in Mexico